Cannabis in Benin is illegal. The country is not a major drug producer or consumer, but increasingly serves as a transshipment point for drugs produced elsewhere. Cannabis is the only drug produced locally in Benin, though mostly on a small scale.

History
The Encyclopedia of Drug Policy noted in 2011 that over the past two decades, sale of cannabis had increasingly fallen under the control of organized crime syndicates operating regionally, particularly from Nigeria. Porto-Novo emerged as a particular transit point, given its proximity to Nigeria which allowed collaboration with Yoruba smugglers.

Enforcement
In 2006, Benin seized 82 kilograms of cannabis.

References

Society of Benin
Benin
Politics of Benin